Tanea undulata, common name the necklace shell, is a species of medium-sized sea snail, a predatory marine gastropod mollusc in the Family Naticidae, the moon snails or necklace shells.

References

 Hollman M. (2008) Naticidae. In Poppe G.T. (ed.) Philippine marine mollusks, vol. 1: 482-501, pls 186-195. Hackenheim: Conchbook
 Saito H. (2017). Family Naticidae. Pp. 858-866, in: T. Okutani (ed.), Marine Mollusks in Japan, ed. 2. 2 vols. Tokai University Press. 1375 pp.

External links
 Röding, P. F. (1798). Museum Boltenianum sive Catalogus cimeliorum e tribus regnis naturæ quæ olim collegerat Joa. Fried Bolten, M. D. p. d. per XL. annos proto physicus Hamburgensis. Pars secunda continens Conchylia sive Testacea univalvia, bivalvia & multivalvia. Trapp, Hamburg. viii, 199 pp
 Récluz, C. A. (1844). Descriptions of new species of Navicella, Neritina, Nerita, and Natica, in the cabinet of H. Cuming, Esq. Proceedings of the Zoological Society of London. (1843) 11: 197-214
 Lamarck, (J.-B. M.) de. (1822). Histoire naturelle des animaux sans vertèbres. Tome sixième, 2me partie. Paris: published by the Author, 232 pp
 Kabat A.R. (2000) Results of the Rumphius Biohistorical Expedition to Ambon (1990). Part 10. Mollusca, Gastropoda, Naticidae. Zoologische Mededelingen 73(25): 345-380
 

Naticidae
Gastropods of New Zealand
Gastropods described in 1798